The women's pole vault at the 2008 Summer Olympics took place between August 16 and 18 at the Beijing National Stadium.

The qualifying standards were 4.45 m (A standard) and 4.30 m (B standard).

The final was won by Yelena Isinbayeva, who set a new world record height of 5.05 meters for the discipline.

During the finals, one of the poles which Brazilian Fabiana Murer would use disappeared, causing her to spend 10–15 minutes trying to get it back. The lost time and having to use another pole led her to bad results. Murer complained about the organization, and would only return to China 7 years later at the 2015 World Championships in Athletics, this time winning a silver medal.

Records 
Prior to this competition, the existing world and Olympic records were as follows:

The following new world and Olympic records were set during this competition.

Results

Qualifying round 
Qualifying performance: 4.60 (Q) or at least 12 best performers (q) advance to the final.

 WR – World Record / =SB – Equal Season Best / PB – Personal Best / SB – Season Best

Final 

The final was held on August 18.

 WR – World Record / =SB – Equal Season Best / PB – Personal Best / SB – Season Best

References 

Athletics at the 2008 Summer Olympics
Pole vault at the Olympics
2008 in women's athletics
Women's events at the 2008 Summer Olympics